Little Chenier is a 2006 American drama film directed by Bethany Ashton Wolf and written by Jace Johnson and Wolf. It is set in the bayous of Louisiana, and stars Johnathon Schaech, Frederick Koehler, Tamara Braun, Jeremy Davidson, Clifton Collins Jr., and Chris Mulkey. The film completed principal photography in Louisiana in August 2005, just days before Hurricane Katrina and Hurricane Rita hit all of the areas they had filmed in. Wolf and Johnson, devastated for the Cajun communities of Southwest Louisiana, were grateful that they could at least give them all this film, celebrating the memory of their land, its beauty and their way of life. Given the loss that so many experienced from these hurricanes, Wolf and Johnson decided to change the ending of the film to one that represented a beacon of hope.   Little Chenier premiered at the Austin Film Festival on October 20, 2006 to a standing ovation, filled with Cajuns, Southerners, and Louisianans. It continued on the festival circuit through 2007, winning 10 Best Picture Awards. It was released January 18, 2008 to a successful theatrical run by Radio London Films, then on DVD July 8, 2008.

Plot

Two brothers are victimized by a weak and jealous man in this drama shot on location in Louisiana. Beauxregard 'Beaux' Dupuis (Jonathan Schaech) lives  in the swamps of Cajun country on a small stretch of land called Little Chenier with his younger mentally handicapped brother, Pemon (Fred Koehler). Beaux supports them both by running a bait shop. Beaux is in love with Mary-Louise (Tamara Braun), who has left him to elope with the son of the sheriff, Carl. Neither Carl nor Beaux are fond of each other. Carl also enjoys tormenting Pemon. It is revealed that Mary-Louise left Beaux for Carl when Carl threatened to take her family's property away. When Carl's father is killed in the line of duty, his son takes his place; it isn't long before Carl learns Mary-Louise has been having an affair with Beaux, and he uses his new authority to put Pemon behind bars on false change as a way of punishing Beaux.

Main cast
 Johnathon Schaech as Beauxregard "Beaux" Dupuis
 Frederick Koehler as Pemon Dupuis
 Tamara Braun as Marie-Louise LeBauve
 Jeremy Davidson as Carl LeBauve
 Clifton Collins Jr. as "T-Boy" Trahan
 Chris Mulkey as Sheriff Kline LeBauve

Hurricane Rita
Three weeks after Hurricane Katrina hit Louisiana, Hurricane Rita hit the Little Chenier the actual place of most filming and the various parishes used for filming. Virtually all of the sets and locations used in the film were destroyed, leaving many locals homeless. The film is believed to be the only known footage of the area. Bethany Ashton and her family set up a non-profit organization called Rita Remembered to rebuild the communities and help those in need, who were largely left out of the eventual help offered to victims of Katrina. The charity is unique in that Ashton and the fellow creators invite people to correspond directly with them to find out exactly how their contributions were used.

Reviews
 Patrick Sweeney, The Tempe Emerald Review (2007)
 Price Savoie, Austin Texan Review (October 2006)
 Betsy Tyson, Screen Spotlight (October 2006)

References

External links 
 

2006 films
2000s English-language films